The 2001–02 Élite Ligue season was the 81st season of the Élite Ligue, the top level of ice hockey in France. Seven teams participated in the league, and Hockey Club de Reims won their second league title.

Regular season

External links 
 Season on hockeyarchives.info

France
Elite
Ligue Magnus seasons